The Apostolic Vicariate of Calapan (Latin: Vicariatus Apostolicus Calapanensis) is a Latin Church missionary jurisdiction or apostolic vicariate of the Catholic Church in Oriental Mindoro, Philippines. In 2010, 756,000 residents had been baptized out of about 814,000 inhabitants. It is currently headed by Bishop Warlito Itcuas Cajandig.

It has six related parishes. The episcopal residence and seat of the vicariate is the Santo Niño Cathedral located in Calapan.

On November 13, 2018, Pope Francis has appointed Fr. Nestor Adalia, currently the Vicar General of Calapan, to take the post as apostolic administrator “ad nutum Sanctae Sedis”, meaning “at the disposition of the Holy See” or to take temporary charge of the administration of the Apostolic Vicariate, due to the health condition of Bishop Warlito Cajandig.

History

The Apostolic Prefecture of Mindoro was created on July 2, 1936, with territory taken from the Roman Catholic Archdiocese of Lipa and Roman Catholic Archdiocese of Jaro (both were dioceses then but are archdioceses now).

On July 12, 1951, Pope Pius XII, through the papal bull Merit ab Apostolic, elevated the apostolic prefecture to an apostolic vicariate.

On December 19, 1974, and January 27, 1983, portions of its territory was lost to the creation of the Diocese of Romblon and the Apostolic Vicariate of San Jose in Mindoro.

Apostolic Vicars
William Finnemann, S.V.D. †: December 4, 1936October 26, 1942, martyred
Henry Ederle, S.V.D. †: June 21, 1946July 12, 1951, resigned
Wilhelm Josef Duschak, S.V.D. †: July 12, 1951November 26, 1973, resigned
Simeon O. Valerio, S.V.D. †: November 26, 1973September 26, 1988, resigned
Warlito Cajanding: April 28, 1989 – present

References

Calapan
1936 establishments in the Philippines
Churches in Oriental Mindoro
Religion in Oriental Mindoro